Hélé Béji (born 1 April 1948) is a Tunisian writer.

Biography 
The daughter of Tunisian politician , she was born in Tunis, passed her Agrégation de lettres modernes and went on to teach literature at the University of Tunis. She later joined UNESCO in Paris. In 1998, she founded the Collège international de Tunis. She has expressed a great admiration for the author Marcel Proust and his influence can be seen in her fiction. In 1983, she received the Prix de l’Afrique méditerranéenne awarded by the Association des écrivains de langue française. She has contributed to the magazines Le Débat and Esprit.

She is the sister of movie producer Tarak Ben Ammar. Her niece Yasmine Torjeman-Besson married French politician Éric Besson.

Selected works 
 Le Désenchantement national, essai sur la décolonisation, political essay (1982)
 L’oeil du jour, novel (1985)
 Itinéraire de Paris à Tunis, satire (1992)
 L'Art contre la culture, essay (1992)
 L’Imposture culturelle, essay (1997)
 Islam Pride, essay (2011)

References 

1948 births
Living people
Tunisian non-fiction writers
Tunisian novelists
Tunisian writers in French
20th-century Tunisian women writers
20th-century Tunisian writers
21st-century Tunisian women writers
21st-century Tunisian writers